Kellerbier is a type of German beer, a lager, which is typically neither clarified nor pasteurised. The term Kellerbier literally translates as "cellar beer", referring to its cool lagering temperatures. Its recipe probably dates to the Middle Ages. 

In comparison with most of today's filtered and pasteurised lagers, Kellerbier contains more of its original brewing yeast, held in suspension. As a result, it is distinctly cloudy, and is described by German producers as naturtrüb (naturally cloudy).

Kellerbier and its related form Zwickelbier are often served directly from the barrel (for example, in a beer garden) but may be bottled as well.

Zwickelbier
The term Zwickelbier, regionally Zwickel or Zwickl, refers to a weaker and less full-flavored variant of Kellerbier. Originally, it was used to refer to the small amount of beer taken by a brewmaster from the barrel with the aid of a special siphon called the Zwickelhahn.

It is less hoppy, and typically not left to age as long as Kellerbier.

References

External links
German Beer Institute - Kellerbier

German beer styles